Testosterone propionate/testosterone valerate/testosterone undecylenate (TP/TV/TUe), sold under the brand name Triolandren, is an injectable combination medication of testosterone propionate (TP), testosterone valerate (TV), and testosterone undecylenate (TUe), which are all androgens/anabolic steroids. It contains 20 mg/mL TP, 80 mg/mL TV, and 150 mg/mL TUe (for a total of 250 mg testosterone ester and 173.8 mg free testosterone) in oil solution and is administered by intramuscular injection at regular intervals. The medication has been reported to have a duration of action of about 10 to 20 days.

See also 
 Testosterone propionate/testosterone enanthate/testosterone undecylenate
 List of combined sex-hormonal preparations § Androgens

References 

Abandoned drugs
Combined androgen formulations